Levi M. Hubbell (July 14, 1826 – December 23, 1910) was an American businessman and politician.

Born in Fairfield County, Connecticut, Hubbell was educated at the Oneida Institute; he then moved to Bradford, Iowa in Chickasaw County, Iowa, in 1859, where he worked in business. Then he moved to Winneshiek County, Iowa where he farmed and finally moved to Waukon, Iowa in 1879 where he died. Hubbell served in the Iowa House of Representatives 1880–1884.

Notes

1826 births
1910 deaths
People from Fairfield County, Connecticut
People from Winneshiek County, Iowa
Members of the Iowa House of Representatives
People from Waukon, Iowa
People from Chickasaw County, Iowa
Businesspeople from Iowa
Farmers from Iowa
19th-century American politicians